American Eagle is a wooden racing roller coaster located at Six Flags Great America theme park in Gurnee, Illinois. It was the first wooden roller coaster designed by Intamin of Switzerland and was built in 1981 by the contracting firm Figley-Wright at a cost of $10 million. While most of the records have since been broken, American Eagle had the longest drop and fastest speeds among wooden roller coasters when it debuted and is still recognized as a top racing coaster in the United States.

History

Construction of American Eagle began in June 1980. American Eagle was designed by Curtis D. Summers, James Figley, and Leonard Wright. Marriott originally contacted John C. Allen to design the coaster, but he did not want to attempt it.

American Eagle cost $10 million to construct and opened to the public on May 23, 1981.

The tent that housed the American Eagle queue area from 1981 to 2006 was used as a circus tent from 1976 to 1980. In 2007, it was converted into a children's area named Kidzopolis (originally Wiggles World). The new entrance is located to the right of Kidzopolis, utilizing part of the entry building for the adjacent Dare Devil Dive skycoaster, which opened in 1997. The old entrance was demolished in 2006. The original bald eagle that was on the roof of the old entrance is being used again on the current entrance.

Ride experience

Queue
Guests enter the queue area to the right of the Kidzopolis section (originally Wiggles World). Prior to Kidzopolis being built, guests entered the queue through the large "Eagle Tent," which had been used for a circus between 1976–1980. Approaching the station, the queue line splits, allowing guests to choose between riding the "Red Side" (left) and the "Blue Side" (right). Both sides offer similar ride experiences, although in 1991, 1996, 2002–2005, 2011 (August 5 – September 17 only), and for the fall of 2013, the Blue Side ran its trains backward. Guests then enter the ride platform from their track's side of the station.

Layout

Upon boarding the train, riders fasten their seat belts and lower their individual lap bar into place. Both red and blue trains are dispatched simultaneously and make a 200-degree turn opposite each other and proceed toward the lift hill. The trains meet up again behind the station where they turn back 20 degrees and begin their ascent side by side. Riders race over two small, yet powerful air time-filled hills before traveling upward and leveling out into a set of trim brakes at the far end of the out-and-back layout. Here, trains are slowed and riders enter a massive 560-degree helix where they circle downward over a small marsh, gradually picking up speed along the way. The helix circles to the left, allowing the red train to pull away, being on the inside of the track. Riders fly out of the helix before the tracks finally separate. The blue train drops low to the earth in an attempt to gain back some of the ground it lost in the helix, while the red train rises up and passes over the blue. Both trains turn right 20 degrees until they are running parallel with each other but separated by the outbound tracks. The red train drops down after passing over the blue and flies over two more airtime hills while the blue train only leaps over one hill after turning its way through the wooden supports. Both trains then rise into the massive wooden structure of the lift hill and are slowed by a final set of trim brakes. Each train then dives opposite each other into a final 360-degree helix, often accompanied by much squealing from the wheels skidding on the metal rails as they negotiate the turn. The blue train circles at a significantly smaller radius in a final attempt at making up the ground it lost in the big helix. The two trains then emerge and rise into the brake run to determine the winner.

Race variables
Some races are close, but in most cases, one side finishes far ahead of the other. Several variables factor into this occurrence. One is that the two tracks are designed to operate independently of one another. They are not linked with one another, so the ride operators on each side must try and time their dispatches together. Another big factor is weight and weight distribution. A train fully loaded with riders will gain more momentum and travel faster than a train carrying no passengers at all. Also, trains with weight positioned more towards the front cars will allow the train to disengage from the lift sooner as the center of gravity passes over the apex of the hill. A final major factor is the brake pressure of the many trim brakes throughout the ride. Often, the brakes will be applied stronger to one side of the track than the other, leading many riders to believe their race is being fixed. Other factors, such as differences in track friction and wind speed, play a lesser role. All variables being equal, however, the ride is designed to end in a tie.

Characteristics
Located in the County Fair section of the park, American Eagle is a dual-track wooden racing coaster that spans almost the entire southern edge of the park. An original design feature was a set of holding brakes that would perch trains at the top of the lift hill for a brief moment to give riders a bird's-eye view of the impending,  drop. Use of the holding brakes was short-lived, however, and they were eventually removed from the track altogether.

Trains 
The ride was also originally designed to run with a total of six trains; however, that number has since been reduced to four (two per track). American Eagle uses three-bench, five-car trains built by the Philadelphia Toboggan Company.  The trains were originally designed with single-position lap bars but are now equipped with individual lap bars and seatbelts, making the trains on both American Eagle and Viper similar.

World records

Previous world records 

Fastest roller coaster until 1988 (7 years)
Largest drop on a roller coaster until 1988 (7 years) (succeeded by Shockwave)
Tallest wooden roller coaster until 1985 (4 years)
Fastest wooden roller coaster until 2000 (19 years)
Largest drop on a wooden roller coaster until 1989 (8 years) (succeeded by Hercules at Dorney Park & Wildwater Kingdom)

Current world records 

Fastest racing wooden roller coaster
Longest racing wooden roller coaster
Tallest racing wooden roller coaster
Largest drop on a racing wooden roller coaster

Incidents

September 9, 1984: Seven guests were hospitalized after two trains collided in the station.
September 7, 1997: Four guests were slightly injured after the second and third cars on the blue train separated and collided on the brake run.
May 22, 2002: An 11-year-old girl was taken to the hospital due to suffering a brain hemorrhage after riding the coaster.

References

External links
Official Page on the Six Flags website
Additional photos and information
The Official Fan Page on Facebook

Roller coasters manufactured by Intamin
Roller coasters operated by Six Flags
Six Flags Great America
Roller coasters in Illinois